The following is a list of some notable Old Worthians, being former pupils of Worth School in the United Kingdom.

Politics

Ferdinand “Bongbong” Romualdez Marcos Jr. - son of former President Ferdinand Marcos and former First Lady Imelda Marcos. Vice Governor of Ilocos Norte (1980–1983); Governor of Ilocos Norte (1983–1986); member of the Philippine House of Representatives from Ilocos Norte's Second District (1992–1995); Governor of Ilocos Norte (1998–2007); Senator in the 16th Congress of the Philippines (2010–2016); 17th President of the Philippines (assumed June 30, 2022).
Ferdinand Alexander “Sandro” Araneta Marcos III - Senior Deputy Majority Floor Leader of the Philippine House of Representatives, Member of the Philippine House of Representatives from the 1st district of Ilocos Norte, eldest son of President Bongbong Marcos and First Lady Liza Araneta-Marcos, grandson of former President Ferdinand Marcos and former First Lady Imelda Marcos.

Religion

 Austen Ivereigh, founder of Catholic Voices, former deputy editor of The Tablet, director for public affairs of the former archbishop of Westminster, Cardinal Cormac Murphy-O'Connor, Fellow in Contemporary Church History at Campion Hall, Oxford University.
 Michael Questier, academic, scholar and historian, focusing on historiography and epistemology of early modern politico-religious history, publishing monographs on post-Reformation history, and English Catholicism between the early Reformation and the English Civil War.
 John MacWilliam, M. Afr., White Father and summoned by the Holy See as elect to the role of Bishop of Laghouat in Algeria; has served as Superior Provincial for North Africa (covering Algeria and Tunisia) since 2015.

Nobility

Sir Dermot de Trafford, 6th Baronet, VRD, invested as a Fellow of the Royal Society of Arts, director of Imperial Continental Gas Association in 1963,chairing Calor Gas,on the board of BNP Paribas.
Anthony Noel, 5th Earl of Gainsborough, President, British Association, Sovereign Military Order of Malta, (1968–74); Knight of the Venerable Order of St John (1970); Chairman of the Hospital of St John and St Elizabeth from 1970 to 1980. 
Francis Ormsby-Gore, 6th Baron Harlech and sat as a Conservative member of the House of Lords.
Rhodri Philipps, 4th Viscount St Davids, also holds the titles of Baron Strange of Knockin (1299), Baron Hungerford (1426), and Baron de Moleyns (1445), and the baronetcy of Picton Castle (1621). He is also a co-heir to the barony of Grey de Ruthyn and married into the titled lineage of Lady St Davids. He is bearer of the Coat of arms of Rhodri Philipps, 4th Viscount St Davids.
Prince Robert of Luxembourg, member of the Grand Ducal Family of Luxembourg, cousin of the reigning grand duke of Luxembourg, president of Domaine Clarence Dillon, and 12th in the line of succession to the Luxembourger throne.

Sport

Onochie Achike, track and field athlete. Achike represented Great Britain in the 2008 Olympics in Beijing.
Tim Hutchings, middle and long-distance runner, represented Great Britain, winning medals in the 1986 European Championship, at the 1986 Commonwealth Games and in the 1984 Olympic Games .
Nigel Laughton, captain in the Black Watch,pilot with the Army Air Corps,director and head of cricket for the Board of Control for Cricket in India for the Indian Premier League and team leader for Team GB at the 2014 Winter Olympics in Sochi. 
Tom Mitchell, England rugby sevens captain; represents England in rugby sevens, won a silver medal representing Great Britain in the 2016 Summer Olympics.
Henry Surtees, racing driver, son of John Surtees.Raced in Formula Renault UK series and at Silverstone's National Circuit. Signed up to FIA Formula Two Championship and scored a podium in   races at Brands Hatch.
Nick Walshe, rugby union scrum-half for England,represented the England A national rugby union team.

Art, Entertainment and Music 

Robert Bathurst, actor. Member of Cambridge University Footlights; has appeared in The House of Eliott, The Detectives, Hornblower, Terry Jones' The Wind in the Willows and Agatha Christie's Poirot.
Harry Enfield, comedian and actor and descendant of noted Victorian era moneyer of the Royal Mint, Edward Enfield.
Peter Jonas (director) (14 October 1946 – 22 April 2020[1]), of Ashkenazi, Jamaican and Lebanese ancestry, CBE, FRCM, FRSA, manager of the English National Opera (1993), director of Bavarian State Opera (Staatsintendant), awarded the Bayerische Verfassungsmedaille, Fellow of the Royal Society of Arts, Knight Bachelor, Bavarian Maximilian Order for Science and Art.
Jim Piddock, actor and author, appeared in Lethal Weapon 2, Austin Powers, Batman (voice actor) and Independence Day.
Matt Preston, journalist for the counterculture, Proto-punk City Limits, restaurant critic and MasterChef Australia judge.
Luke Elwes, artist, and, in 1998,was Artist-in-residence on an expedition to Mount Kailash.

Broadcasting
James Longman is an English journalist and foreign correspondent for US network ABC News. Previously, he worked at the BBC. 
Christopher Price, journalist and presenter, best known as the original host of BBC celebrity news show Liquid News.
Dominic Waghorn, British journalist, Diplomatic Editor of Sky News. Waghorn was awarded the Royal Television Society Television Journalist of the Year and News Item of the Year in 2007, for a series of investigative reports in China. He also won Foreign Press Association Journalist of the Year Award, the One World Media Journalist of the Year Award, and a Golden Nymph for Best TV News Item in the Monte Carlo TV Festival. He is based at Sky News' Washington Bureau.

Business

Sir David Charles Maurice Bell is director of Pearson Group and chairman of the Financial Times, Chair of the Syndicate of Cambridge University Press,Chair of the Media Standards Trust, administering the Orwell Prize,assessor on the Leveson Inquiry, chairman of Crisis UK until 2012 and trustee of Common Purpose UK. He was made a Knight Bachelor in the Queen's 2004 Birthday Honours.  
Sir John Chisholm, FREng, CEng, FIEE, FRAeS, FInstP, chairman of the Medical Research Council and QinetiQ in 2010.
Michael Spencer has been described as the richest self-made person in the City of London and a "City grandee". According to the Sunday Times Rich List in 2021, he is worth an estimated £1.2 billion, and was awarded a peerage in the 2020 Political Honours list.
Fernando Zobel de Ayala, director of the Bank of the Philippine Islands,Member of the World Economic Forum, Member of the World Presidents' Organization, Trustee, Pilipinas Shell Foundation and president of Ayala Corporation,awarded with the Philippine Legion of Honor, Rank of Grand Commander.
Jaime Augusto Zobel de Ayala, chairman of Ayala Corporation,Chairman, Bank of the Philippine Islands, chairman, Globe Telecom, Inc., chair, Harvard Business School Asia-Pacific Advisory Board, Member, JP Morgan International Council, Member, Council for Inclusive Capitalism with the Vatican City.

Military
Air Vice-Marshall David Hawkins, Member of the British Empire, air vice-marshal, Commandant-General of the RAF Regiment, Companion of the Most Honourable Order of the Bath, officer of the Royal Household, Lieutenant in the Royal Victorian Order and Deputy Lord-Lieutenant for Greater London.
Neil Laughton (born 31 October 1963),former army officer of The Royal Marines, entrepreneur and adventurer who has completed the Explorers Grand Slam of climbing the highest mountains on all seven continents and reaching both the North and South Poles. He holds a number of records for his activities on land, sea and air. The Royal Geographical Society selected him for the Ness Award in 2005 and is Chairman of the Society for Scientific Exploration.
General Sir Patrick Sanders, British Army officer, awarded the Distinguished Service Order, appointed a Commander of the Order of the British Empire, Colonel Commandant and President of the Honourable Artillery Company, full general and Commander of Joint Forces Command, and appointed Knight Commander of the Order of the Bath (KCB) in the 2020 New Year Honours.

Other

Michael Aris, historian of Tripiṭaka, Sthavira nikāya, Mahāsāṃghika schools, Abhidharma, Vinaya, Theravada, Mahayana and Vajrayana Buddhism and ancient collections of Buddhist texts, tutor to the Bhutanese royal family and husband of Aung San Suu Kyi, Burmese politician, diplomat, author, and Nobel Peace Prize laureate.
Philip Mould, OBE, valuer for the National Lottery Heritage Fund, art adviser to the House of Commons and the House of Lords, art dealer and historian.
Andrew Murray, chair of the Stop the War Coalition (2001 until 2016), member of the Communist Party of Great Britain and journalist for the radical Marxist journals of praxis, historiography, epistemology and dialectic, Soviet Novosti news agency, Morning Star and Tribune.[4][5] trade union official and journalist, adviser to Jeremy Corbyn from 2018 to 2020. Murray served on the Communist Party of Britain executive committee from 2000 to 2004, supporting the Respect Coalition.
Michael Questier, academic and historian, British Academy Postdoctoral Fellow at King's College London, Visiting Fellow at All Souls College, Oxford.

See also
 :Category:People educated at Worth School

References

 
People educated by school in West Sussex
Worthians
Worth School